Four submarines of the French Navy have borne the name Saphir

 , an  launched in 1908
 , the name ship of her class, launched in 1928
 , an ex-British S-class submarine, HMS Satyr, transferred to French service in 1952
 , a  nuclear attack submarine launched in 1981

French Navy ship names